The Ones Below is a 2015 British thriller directed by David Farr in his feature debut. It was shown in the Panorama section at the 66th Berlin International Film Festival and released on 11 March 2016 in the United Kingdom.

Plot
Kate (Clémence Poésy) and Justin (Stephen Campbell Moore) are expecting their first child. They also have new downstairs neighbours, Jon (David Morrissey) and Theresa (Laura Birn), who are also expecting their first baby. Kate and Justin invite Jon and Theresa for dinner so they can get acquainted; the visitors leave their shoes by the door, at the top of the stairs. During their dinner conversation, it's revealed that Kate and Justin originally didn't want children and were together 10 years before deciding to have a baby, and conceived rather quickly thereafter. Jon and Theresa tell them they struggled for seven years to have a child, and Theresa is visibly upset that Kate got pregnant as quickly as she did, while she and Jon had tried for years. Eventually, Theresa, who has been surreptitiously drinking wine all evening, despite claiming not to drink alcohol.  She says she doesn't feel well and gets up to leave. In her rush to get out the door, a tipsy Theresa trips over Kate's cat and their shoes, and falls down the stairs and subsequently loses the baby, whom she was going to name Peter.

When Kate and Justin attempt to console the grieving couple, they end up in a fight with Theresa, who blames them for the accident and screams that Kate does not deserve "that thing" inside her. A few days later, Kate and Justin receive a note stating that their neighbours have left and will return only when they can truly be happy for Kate and Justin's new addition.

Kate gives birth and they name the baby Billy. Her emotionally distant mother visits, but Kate is offended by her obvious lack of interest in her grandchild. Not long after Billy is born, Jon and Theresa return, apparently in good spirits. Theresa offers to babysit Billy so Kate can have time to herself. When Kate goes off to visit the grave of her brother, who died at 17 by what is implied to be suicide, Theresa leaves the house with Billy, but where she takes him isn't revealed. Periodically, Theresa and Jon are shown out and about with Billy. They are smiling and look like any happy couple with a new baby.

Kate and Justin are invited to supper by Jon and Theresa. Kate brings the baby monitor, over which she hears an adult breathing. Convinced there is someone in the flat, she rushes upstairs to find the bath overflowing. Over the next few days, Kate grows increasingly suspicious about the other couple's behaviour. Kate leaves Billy with Theresa and then sneaks back upstairs to observe her secretly. She sees Theresa take pictures of Billy and put him to her breast, apparently in an attempt to breastfeed him. Appalled, Kate breaks into Theresa's flat and finds the camera with photos of Billy and photos of Jon and Theresa in public with Billy. She also discovers a fully furnished nursery complete with a framed photo of Jon and Theresa holding a baby, presumably Billy. Kate later drags Justin downstairs and forces her way into the flat only to find that the photos have been wiped from the camera and the picture in the nursery has been changed.

Kate, now on the verge of a complete breakdown, asks Justin to move to a new flat. They find a new place and he works from home until moving day. This plan is cut short when he's called to work for an emergency. He hands Kate the milk, which she's often seen drinking, as he's leaving and tells her to call the moving van for tomorrow. When Justin reaches the office, he discovers there is no urgent meeting. He then receives an email from Kate stating she's "so sorry." He rushes home to find Kate drowned in the bath, apparently having killed herself after tossing the baby into a nearby canal. Heartbroken, Justin moves out, as do Jon and Theresa.

The flashback that follows reveals what really happened: Theresa and Jon drugged Kate via the milk from the bottle Justin handed to her on the way out of the door; Jon sent Kate's "sorry" email to Justin from her laptop; and Theresa, dressed in Kate's clothes, threw a bundle resembling a swaddled baby into the canal. It's later intimated that the bundle was Kate and Justin's cat.

The final scene shows Jon and Theresa in their new home in Germany, where they're settling with their baby, "Peter."

Cast
 Clémence Poésy as Kate
 David Morrissey as Jon
 Stephen Campbell Moore as Justin
 Laura Birn as Theresa
 Deborah Findlay as Tessa
 Jonathan Harden as Mark

Production
The film was partially shot at the Port of Dover ferry terminal in Kent.

Reception

Critical response
On review aggregator Rotten Tomatoes, the film has an approval rating of 76% based on 49 reviews, with an average rating of 6.2/10. The website's critics' consensus reads: "Creepy and well-crafted overall, The Ones Below marks an auspicious feature-length debut for writer-director David Farr." On Metacritic, the film holds a score of 63 out of 100, based on 13 critics, indicating "generally favorable reviews".

Christy Lemire, writing for RogerEbert.com, gave the film a score of 3 stars out of 4, writing: "David Farr takes the giddy, heady days of early motherhood—the frustration and isolation, the exhaustion and confusion—and mines them for creepy, paranoid thrills in "The Ones Below."" She concluded: "Comparisons to Roman Polanski—particularly to "Rosemary’s Baby"—might seem obvious given the subject matter and setting. But Farr’s film stands on its own: lean, brisk and stylistically precise, and mercilessly free of gratuitous jump scares and gore." Joe Morgenstern of The Wall Street Journal noted the film's lack of originality, but wrote: "Still, there’s plenty to enjoy in the film, starting with a pair of affecting performances by Clémence Poésy and Laura Birn, and ending with a perverse twist on the notion of blissful parenthood." Peter Bradshaw of The Guardian gave the film a score of 4 stars out of 5. He described the film as "an intimately disturbing nightmare of the upper middle classes, with tinges of melodrama and staginess, entirely appropriate for its air of suppressed psychosis." He noted some issues with the film's plot, as well as some similarities with the drama Gas Light and the films Fatal Attraction and The Hand That Rocks the Cradle, but concluded: "It is a thoroughly gripping, horribly absorbing movie."

References

External links
 
 

2015 films
2015 thriller films
2015 directorial debut films
British thriller films
Films about child abduction
2010s English-language films
2010s British films